The Real Charlotte is a novel (written between 1888 and 1890, and published in 1894) by the Anglo-Irish writing partnership Somerville and Ross, composed of Edith Somerville (1858–1949) and Violet Florence Martin (1862–1915).
 The first printing in 1894 consisted of three volumes containing a total of 51 chapters.  The three volumes were reprinted in a single volume in 1895, with many further single-volume reprints in the following years.

Settings
The first chapter takes place in Dublin in 1883, showing the young Francie Fitzpatrick and Roderick Lambert.

The rest of the book is set in 1889–90 in rural County Galway, in or near to Connemara, with some chapters in Bray, County Wicklow and Paris. (Some accounts claim that the book is set in County Cork, but mentions of Galway city, Ballinasloe, "the Connemara mountains" and the "Galway hills" make it clear that it is set in County Galway.)

Characters

Mullen-Fitzpatrick family
 Charlotte Mullen, forty years old, single and unattractive both inside and out.
 Francie Fitzpatrick, first cousin once removed of Charlotte. An urban middle-class girl of nineteen, considered beautiful by all.
 Johnny Fitzpatrick, Francie's father
 Isabella Mullen, Francie's mother
 Letitia (Tish) Fitzpatrick, Francie's aunt
 Robert Fitzpatrick, Francie's uncle

Lambert family
 Roderick (Roddy) Lambert, agent of the Dysarts.
 Lucy Lambert (née Galvin), his wife, a nervous older woman with money

Dysart family
 Sir Benjamin Dysart, Baronet, local landlord, disabled by stroke.
 Lady Isabel Dysart, his wife, thirty years younger than him.
 Christopher Dysart, their eldest son. Suitor to Francie.
 Pamela Dysart, their daughter
 Garrett (Garry) Dysart, the youngest son.

Servants
 Louisa, a Protestant orphan girl who is house- and parlour-maid to Charlotte.
 Norry the Boat, Catholic servant of Charlotte
 Bid Sal, Catholic servant of Charlotte
 Eliza Hackett, maid in the Lambert household
 Bridget, maid in the Fitzpatrick household

Others
 Fanny Hemphill, city friend of Francie
 Evelyn Hope-Drummond, English friend of Pamela, staying with the Dysarts.
 Archdeacon Gascogne, local Church of Ireland clergyman.
 Kate (Kitty) Gascogne, his wife.
 Julia Duffy, wise woman, Irish Catholic tenant of Charlotte
 Father Heffernan, local Catholic priest
 Captain Cursiter, a gentleman boat-owner (named Thesiger on his first appearance, apparently a continuity error)
 Lieutenant Gerald Hawkins, Army officer and suitor of Francie
 Rev. Joseph Corkran, the local Church of Ireland curate
 Mrs. Corkran, his wife

Reception and legacy
Initial reviews were negative, with English critics bemoaning the use of the grotesque, disliking the antiheroine Charlotte, and bemoaning the lack of a happy ending.

In 2000, Brian Fallon wrote in The Irish Times that The Real Charlotte "is generally agreed to be Somerville and Ross's masterpiece, and one of the half-dozen or so Irish novels which might justifiably be called great […] though the authors are somewhat snobbish and condescending towards Francie, the pretty young interloper from Dublin, she is real and touching even in her social gaucherie. The contrasting portrait of scheming Charlotte herself, a really bad woman, has a kind of Balzacian power."

In 2003, it was placed 32nd in "Novel Choice", a list of the top 50 Irish novels.

Molly Keane wrote in 1987 (in her Introduction to the Arrow edition of the book) that if the book had been written today it would "be almost a certainty for the Booker Prize, the American Book of the Month Choice, and most probably for the script of an important film travesty".  She noted that "the book is a superb piece of architecture" and that it is "an unsurpassed example of a fusion between two lively minds", and that its authors "must have realised their extraordinary achievement, and may have doubted if they could ever touch it again."

Scottish pianist and writer Susan Tomes in 2014 wrote that "I can hardly believe that such a fine book has fallen out of the public eye. […] The authors’ understanding of character and motive is remarkable, and their description of life in Ireland at the end of the 19th century is memorably vivid. Even better, the intricate plot closes slowly upon its characters like a giant pair of pincers."

In 2017, Anne Haverty wrote that "The Real Charlotte [may] be the best Irish novel, qua novel, of any century. As Anthony Cronin says, Ulysses, which might seem to qualify as “the best”, is a “fictive construction”, while The Real Charlotte is a powerful exemplar of the classic novel as it was, and sometimes still is, written."

Heather Ingman listed it among her ten favourite Irish books.

Malcolm Jones wrote in The Daily Beast that "The title character […] is such a terrible force of nature that she literally frightens another character to death. That hasn’t stopped me from urging people to make her acquaintance every chance I get."

Adaptation
In 1975, a stage adaptation was produced at the Gate Theatre, written by Terence de Vere White and Adrian Vale and starring Pat Leavy.

In 1990, The Real Charlotte was adapted into a three-part TV miniseries for ITV, starring Jeananne Crowley as Charlotte, Patrick Bergin as Roderick and Joanna Roth as Francie.

References

External links

The Real Charlotte full text at Project Gutenberg

1894 novels
19th-century Irish novels
Irish romance novels
Novels set in Ireland
Novels set in the 1880s
Novels set in the 1890s